Bani Juma'ah is a sub-district located in Al Qafr District, Ibb Governorate, Yemen. Bani Juma'ah had a population of  5585 as of 2004.

References 

Sub-districts in Al Qafr District